Toby Ansin (née Lerner; born January 3, 1941) is the former wife of the late Edmund Ansin, co-founder of Sunbeam Television In 1985, she founded Miami City Ballet, a dance company that altered the cultural landscape of the city of Miami and which subsequently acquired a national and international reputation. Ansin has continuously served on the Board of Trustees since its founding. Miami City Ballet is the largest South Florida arts organization reaching an annual audience of over 125,000 in four Florida counties. It includes a ballet school with over 1500 students and adults.

Education
Ansin attended Brookline High School in Brookline, Massachusetts for her freshman year, then transferred to Buckingham School, now Buckingham Browne & Nichols, in Cambridge, Massachusetts, graduating in 1959. She attended Wellesley College in Wellesley, Massachusetts from September 1959 until June 1961. Shortly after marrying Edmund Ansin she transferred to the University of Miami in Coral Gables, Florida, graduating cum laude in 1963 with a B.A. in American History.

Community service
From 1976 to 1981 she was Chairperson of The Fine Arts of Beth David, Miami, Florida. Under her leadership in 1978 she presented the Pearl Lang Dance Company; in 1979 pianist Emanuel Ax; and in 1980 cellist Nathaniel Rosen. In September, 1980, in collaboration with art dealer, Barbara Gillman, Ansin organized the personal appearance of Andy Warhol in Miami and the world premiere of his Ten Portraits of Jews of The 20th Century. From 1982 to 1987 she was a councilperson on the Dade County Council of Arts and Sciences, and assisted in creating, implementing, and serving as liaison to The Dance Umbrella, a service organization for the dance companies of Dade County, Florida.  In 1985, David Eden, artistic consultant to the Dance Umbrella and a colleague of Ansin's, aware of her interest in creating a professional ballet company in South Florida, suggested she meet and consult with Edward Villella on what were the necessary steps to form a ballet company.  On May 14, 1985, Villella came to Ansin's home in Coral Gables, Florida and met with her for three hours to discuss the specific artistic, administrative, and financial steps required to form a professional dance company. After he left she called 6 friends, each of whom, along with Ansin contributed a thousand dollars, the seminal funds that resulted in the creation of the founding board of trustees and the recruiting of Villella, initially as a consultant, then on a one-year contract as artistic director. Once a professional administrative staff was in place, she focused her efforts on fund raising, special events, and public relations. In 1987, she flew to Monte Carlo, Monaco and personally arranged for the visit of her Serene Highness Princess Caroline of Monaco to Miami the following April to benefit Miami City Ballet, Les Ballets de Monte-Carlo, and the Princess Grace Foundation. For 27 years she worked without compensation, until her longtime companion, Leonard J. Rapport, was diagnosed with pancreatic cancer, requiring her to retire from active participation at MCB, (except for remaining on the board of directors), to care for him until his death ten months later. Today she remains an active board member. Every year, since 2010, The Toby Lerner Ansin Scholarship Award is given to the most promising dancer in the MCB school.

Personal life
Toby Lerner Ansin was born in Boston, Massachusetts to Dr. Henry H. Lerner, a radiologist and Helen (née Kruger) Lerner.  She married Edmund N. Ansin on June 11, 1961, and had three children with him: Andrew Lerner Ansin, who works at Sunbeam Properties; James Lerner Ansin, who works at Sunbeam Television Corporation (both companies owned by their father, Edmund); and Stephanie Lerner Ansin, founder and artistic director of the Miami Theater Center. Toby Lerner Ansin and Edmund N. Ansin were divorced in November 1983. Her brother Bennett Lerner is a concert pianist who made his debut at the Carnegie Recital Hall in New York City in 1976.

Awards
1991, George Abbot Award for Outstanding Achievement in the Arts,
1991, American Red Cross Spectrum Award,
1997, Florida Arts Recognition Award, 
1999, James W. McLamore Outstanding Volunteer Award,
2008, South Florida International Press Club Award for Community Service
2015, Dance/USA Champion Award

References

External links
Miami Herald 05/03/91 "Once Upon Toby Ansin's dream and persistence" by Jane Woolridge

American ballerinas
1941 births
Living people
People from Boston
People from Miami
Buckingham Browne & Nichols School alumni
Wellesley College alumni
University of Miami alumni
Brookline High School alumni
21st-century American women